Graomys is a genus of rodent in the family Cricetidae. It contains the following species:
 Central leaf-eared mouse (Graomys chacoensis)
 Pale leaf-eared mouse (Graomys domorum)
 Edith's leaf-eared mouse (Graomys edithae)
 Gray leaf-eared mouse (Graomys griseoflavus)

References

 
Rodent genera
Taxa named by Oldfield Thomas
Taxonomy articles created by Polbot